Abderrahmane Sbai ( – 1940 – 22 October 2010) was a Moroccan politician and civil servant who was Minister Delegate to the Head of Government, in charge of National Defense Administration from 1997 to 2010. He held a degree in "geographic engineering".

Born at Fes in 1940, he attended primary and secondary school in El Jadida. He died in Rabat in October 2010.

See also
Cabinet of Morocco

References

Government ministers of Morocco
1940 births
Moroccan engineers
People from Fez, Morocco
People from El Jadida
2010 deaths